Tiger Woods PGA Tour 12: The Masters is a sports video game developed by EA Tiburon and published by EA Sports for PlayStation 3, Wii, Xbox 360, Microsoft Windows and Mac OS X, and is the last game in the series available on a Nintendo platform.

Features
Tiger Woods PGA Tour 12 featured The Masters tournament at Augusta National Golf Club for the first time. It also features the debut of commentary by Jim Nantz of CBS Sports and the return of David Feherty. Professional golfers Rickie Fowler, Bubba Watson and Zach Johnson made their debuts in the game.

Reception

Tiger Woods PGA Tour 12 received "generally unfavorable" for the PC versions and "generally favorable" reviews for the console versions, according to review aggregator Metacritic.

References

2011 video games
EA Sports games
Golf video games
MacOS games
Multiplayer and single-player video games
PlayStation 3 games
PlayStation Move-compatible games
Sports video games set in the United States
Tiger Woods video games
Video games developed in the United States
Video games set in Australia
Video games set in Canada
Video games set in China
Video games set in the United Arab Emirates
Video games set in the United Kingdom
Wii MotionPlus games
Wii games
Windows games
Xbox 360 games